Oxyepoecus inquilinus is species of ant in the genus Oxyepoecus. It is endemic to Argentina. The species is listed together with two other Oxyepoecus species (O. daguerrei, and O. bruchi) as "Vulnerable D2" by IUCN.

References

External links

Myrmicinae
Endemic fauna of Argentina
Hymenoptera of South America
Insects described in 1952
Vulnerable animals
Vulnerable biota of South America
Taxonomy articles created by Polbot